The MTs 5 (МЦ 5) is a family of Soviet double-barreled high-quality custom hunting shotguns, combination guns and rifles.

History 

MTs 5 was designed and produced by TsKIB SOO since 1950. It was shown at VDNKh exhibition in Moscow.

In November 1965, the price of one new MTs 5 was between 350 and 400 roubles. According to the official statement of TsKIB SOO specialists, it was the most durable and reliable civilian hunting weapon ever made in the USSR (by this time several MTs 5 guns had already withstood from 100,000 to 150,000 shots without breaking).

In June 1981, the price of one new MTs 5 was between 250 and 600 roubles.

After the model MTs 105 was developed, the production of MTs 5 was discontinued.

Design 
MTs 5 is an over and under hammerless gun, with one barrel above the other.

All guns have a walnut shoulder stock (with or without cheekpiece) and fore-end, some of them were decorated with engravings.

MTs 5 hunting rifles and combination guns can be equipped with detachable optical sight. The first MTs 5 guns were equipped with 3.5× optical sight P.O.T. (П.О.Т.), later they were equipped with 4× optical sight TO-4 and other optical sights.

MTs 5 was the first Soviet serial firearm equipped with optical sight that was sold as civilian hunting weapon.

Variants 
The MTs 5 was produced in twenty nine different versions.
 MTs 5 (МЦ 5) - a smoothbore double-barreled hunting shotgun with 750mm barrels, 3.0 - 3.2 kg
 MTs 5-01 (МЦ 5-01) - а hunting double-barreled rifle with 600mm barrels (.22 LR and 6.5mm rifle cartridge), 3.2 - 3.4 kg.; it was equipped with 3.5× optical sight P.O.T.
 MTs 5-02 (МЦ 5-02) - а hunting rifle with 600mm barrels (.22 LR and 7.62×54mmR), 3.2 - 3.4 kg.; it was equipped with 4× optical sight TO-4
 MTs 5-09 (МЦ 5-09) - а hunting rifle with 600mm barrels (.22 LR and 9×53mmR barrels), 3.2 - 3.4 kg.
 MTs 5-12 (МЦ 5-12) - а combination gun with 675mm barrels (32 gauge smoothbore barrel and .22 LR rifled barrel), 2.25 - 2.5 kg.
 MTs 5-14 (МЦ 5-14) - а combination gun with 675mm barrels (28 gauge smoothbore barrel and .22 LR rifled barrel), 2.6 - 2.8 kg.
 MTs 5-15 (МЦ 5-15) - а combination gun with 675mm barrels (20 gauge smoothbore barrel and .22 LR rifled barrel), 2.8 - 3.0 kg.; it was equipped with 2× optical sight
 MTs 5-18 (МЦ 5-18) - а combination gun with 675mm barrels (16 gauge smoothbore barrel and .22 LR rifled barrel), 3.0 - 3.25 kg.
 MTs 5-20 (МЦ 5-20) - a 20/70 smoothbore double-barreled hunting shotgun with 675mm barrels, 2.6 - 2.8 kg
 MTs 5-24 (МЦ 5-24) - а combination gun with 600mm barrels (28 gauge smoothbore barrel and 9×53mmR rifled barrel), 3.0 - 3.2 kg.
 MTs 5-26 (МЦ 5-26) - а combination gun with 675mm barrels (20 gauge and 6.5mm rifle cartridge), 3.2 - 3.4 kg
 MTs 5-27 (МЦ 5-27) - а combination gun with 675mm barrels (20 gauge and 7.62×54mmR), 3.2 - 3.4 kg
 MTs 5-28 (МЦ 5-28) - a 28/70 smoothbore double-barreled hunting shotgun with 675mm barrels, 2.4 - 2.6 kg
 MTs 5-32 (МЦ 5-32) - a 32/70 smoothbore double-barreled hunting shotgun with 675mm barrels, 2.2 - 2.4 kg
 MTs 5-35 (МЦ 5-35) - а combination gun with 675mm barrels (20 gauge smoothbore barrel and 5.6×39mm rifled barrel), 3.0 - 3.2 kg.
 MTs 105 (МЦ 105) - next model

References

Sources 
 Охотничье двуствольное ружьё МЦ 5 // Охотничье, спортивное огнестрельное оружие. Каталог. М., 1958. стр.21-22
 Охотничье двуствольное ружьё МЦ 5 // Спортивно-охотничье оружие и патроны. Бухарест, "Внешторгиздат", 1965. стр.58-59
 Виктор Рон. Пятёрочка // журнал "Оружие", № 3, 2012. стр.64 - ISSN 1728-9203

Double-barreled shotguns of the Soviet Union
Combination guns
TsKIB SOO products
5.6×39mm firearms
7.62×54mmR firearms
9×53mmR firearms